Holme Marsh (Originally Holmes) is a village in Herefordshire, England on the A480 road. It is near the Welsh border and the small town of Kington. A 'Holme' is an island in a marsh, (Angle Saxon) There were once at least two ponds.

Villages in Herefordshire